The following list of Carnegie libraries in Pennsylvania provides detailed information on United States Carnegie libraries in Pennsylvania, where 59 public libraries were built from 27 grants (totaling $5,169,587) awarded by the Carnegie Corporation of New York from 1886 to 1917. Notably, Allegheny County, Pennsylvania contains the first Carnegie libraries ever donated by the philanthropist, owing to his personal connection to the Pittsburgh area. Architectural Critic Patricia Lowry calls them "Pittsburgh's most significant cultural export".

Five out of the first seven, six of the first ten, and seven of the first twelve libraries that Carnegie commissioned in America are in Allegheny County. Also, eleven of the first fourteen Carnegie funded libraries to open in America were in Allegheny County. In all, 19 libraries were commissioned in the county and several of them are more than just libraries but are cultural centers as well.

Also among the libraries built were 25 in Philadelphia which are listed separately. 
In addition to public libraries, academic libraries were built for 9 institutions, more than any other state. These grants totaled $441,000. In addition Carnegie founded two entire colleges in Pittsburgh, Carnegie Institute of Technology and Margaret Morrison College for Women. Both are today part of Carnegie Mellon University.

Key

Public libraries

Academic libraries

Notes

References

Note: The above references, while all authoritative, are not entirely mutually consistent. Some details of this list may have been drawn from one of the references without support from the others.  Reader discretion is advised.

Pennsylvania
 
Libraries
Libraries